Daulo Araian  is a village in Kapurthala district of Punjab State, India. The village is administrated by a Sarpanch, who is an elected representative.

Demography 
According to the report published by Census India in 2011, Daulo Araian has a total number of 21 houses and population of 103 of which include 61 males and 42 females. Literacy rate of Daulo Araian is 80.81%, higher than state average of 75.84%.  The population of children under the age of 6 years is 4 which is  3.88% of total population of Daulo Araian, and child sex ratio is approximately  0, lower than state average of 846.

Caste  
The village has schedule caste (SC) constitutes zero percentage of total population of the village and it doesn't have any Schedule Tribe (ST) population.

Population data

Air travel connectivity 
The closest airport to the village is Sri Guru Ram Dass Jee International Airport.

Villages in Kapurthala

External links
  Villages in Kapurthala
 Kapurthala Villages List

References

Villages in Kapurthala district